Busi can refer to:
 Busi (given name)
 Busi (surname)
 Al-Busi, a former small state in present-day Yemen, one of the five sheikhdoms of Upper Yafa
 Busi (Tanzanian ward), an administrative ward in the Kondoa district of the Dodoma Region of Tanzania 
 an alternate spelling of the bushido, the samurai code of conduct